Juan Carlos Obregón Jr. (born 29 October 1997) is a professional footballer who plays as a forward for F.C. Motagua. Born in the United States, he represents Honduras at youth level.

Early life
Obregón Jr. was born in New York, New York to Juan and Maria, both immigrants from Honduras.

Career

College, amateur and youth
Obregón Jr. played two years of college soccer at Siena College between 2015 and 2016. While at college, he also appeared for USL PDL side F.A. Euro in 2016. While at Sienna, Obregón Jr. played with Conor McGlynn who would also be his teammate with Hartford Athletic.

Following college, Obregón Jr. joined Liga MX side Necaxa. During his time with their Under-20 side, Obregón Jr. netted 6 goals in 24 appearances.

Professional
In September 2019, Obregón Jr. signed with USL Championship side Rio Grande Valley FC.

In April 2021, Obregón Jr. signed with USL Championship side Hartford Athletic for the 2021 USL Championship season. He set a club record in 2021 with ten goals in a season.

International
In 2017 he was with the Honduran U-20 team but did not make an appearance while at the 2017 CONCACAF U-20 Championship.

Obregón Jr. made his first appearance for the Honduran U-23 team in the 2020 CONCACAF Men's Olympic Qualifying Championship in March 2021, coming on in the second half of Honduras's 3–0 win over Haiti. Obregón Jr. scored Honduras's opening goal to help the team defeat USA and qualify for the Summer Olympics.

In Obregon's Olympic debut, he was instrumental in Honduras' comeback win over New Zealand, scoring the equalizing goal in a eventual 3–2 victory.

References

External links 

1997 births
Living people
People from New York City
American people of Honduran descent
Honduran footballers
Association football forwards
Soccer players from New York City
USL League Two players
USL Championship players
F.A. Euro players
Rio Grande Valley FC Toros players
Hartford Athletic players
F.C. Motagua players
Liga Nacional de Fútbol Profesional de Honduras players
Honduran expatriate sportspeople in the United States
Honduran expatriate footballers
Expatriate soccer players in the United States
Honduras youth international footballers
Siena Saints men's soccer players
Footballers at the 2020 Summer Olympics
Olympic footballers of Honduras